Podocarpus smithii is a species of conifer in the family Podocarpaceae. It is found only in Queensland, Australia.

References

Pinales of Australia
smithii
Least concern flora of Australia
Flora of Queensland
Conservation dependent biota of Queensland
Taxonomy articles created by Polbot
Taxa named by David John de Laubenfels